Dalsze okolice is a poetry collection by Czesław Miłosz. It was first published in 1991.

The collection has been subject to scholarly studies in the context of religion and mysticism.

References

1991 poetry books
Polish poetry collections
Poetry by Czesław Miłosz